German submarine U-2336 was a Type XXIII U-boat of Nazi Germany's Kriegsmarine during World War II.

U-2336 had a very short career. She only conducted one war patrol and sank only three vessels, one of which was another German U-boat, during an accidental collision.

After the war, U-2336 was surrendered to the Allies, taken to the British port of Lisahally and sunk in Operation Deadlight on 3 January 1946.

Construction

U-2336 was the 16th U-boat of the Type XXIII class. She was ordered on 20 September 1943, and was laid down on 27 July 1944 at Deutsche Werft, Hamburg, as yard number 490. She was launched on 10 September 1944 and commissioned under the command of Leutnant zur See Jürgen Vockel on 30 September.

Design
Like all Type XXIII U-boats, U-2336 had a displacement of  when at the surface and  while submerged. The submarine was powered by one MWM six-cylinder RS134S diesel engine providing , one AEG GU4463-8 double-acting electric motor electric motor providing , and one BBC silent running CCR188 electric motor providing .

U-2336 was fitted with two  torpedo tubes in the bow. She could carry two preloaded torpedoes. The complement was 14–18 men. This class of U-boat did not carry a deck gun.

Service history
U-2336 trained with the 32nd U-boat Flotilla from 30 September 1944 until 15 February 1945, and began her first voyage as a front boat of the 4th U-boat Flotilla on 16 February 1945. U-2344 was sunk, with the loss of 11 crew. It took about two months for U-2336 to leave her home port of Kiel, which she did on 18 April 1945 under a new commander, Kapitänleutnant Emil Klusmeier. After traveling across the straits of Kattegat and Skagerrak, U-2336 reached Larvik, Norway on 24 April 1945. This was to be her home port for the remaining few days of the war.

First patrol
On 1 May 1945, U-2336 left Larvik and headed out into the North Sea. On 7 May 1945, U-2336 sank the last Allied merchant ships to be lost to a German submarine in the war, when she torpedoed the freighters Avondale Park and Sneland I (in order) off the Isle of May inside the Firth of Forth. Sneland I exploded as soon as it was hit and sank two minutes later, killing seven crew members, including the captain. Avondale Park lost two crew members, with the rest entering lifeboat or jumping into the sea. U-2336 returned to Kiel on 14 May 1945 and then transferred to Wilhelmshaven, Germany, where she was surrendered to the Western Allies.

Post-war
U-2336 was taken to Lisahally, United Kingdom on 21 June 1945 to take part in Operation Deadlight where she was sunk on 3 January 1946 by gunfire from the British destroyer .

Summary of raiding history

See also
 Battle of the Atlantic
 Actions of 7–8 May 1945

References

Notes

Citations

Bibliography

External links

U-boats commissioned in 1944
World War II submarines of Germany
1944 ships
U-boats scuttled in 1946
Type XXIII submarines
Ships built in Hamburg
Operation Deadlight
U-boat accidents
Maritime incidents in February 1945
Maritime incidents in 1946